Oskar Adolf Hainari (7 March 1856 – 23 January 1910; surname until 1906 Forsström) was a Finnish secondary school teacher, journalist and politician, born in Tohmajärvi. He was a Member of the Diet of Finland in 1899, in 1900 and from 1904 to 1905 and a Member of the Parliament of Finland from 1908 until his death in 1910, representing the Finnish Party.

References

1856 births
1910 deaths
People from Tohmajärvi
People from Kuopio Province (Grand Duchy of Finland)
Finnish Party politicians
Members of the Diet of Finland
Members of the Parliament of Finland (1908–09)
Members of the Parliament of Finland (1909–10)
University of Helsinki alumni